Le Fantasque was a liberal newspaper created in 1837 in Quebec, Canada, by Napoléon Aubin. It was published until 1845. Its style was humorous and used literary irony against censorship.

See also
List of newspapers in Canada

References

Newspapers established in 1837
Publications disestablished in 1845
Newspapers published in Quebec City
1837 establishments in Lower Canada